Krzysztof Wójcik may refer to:

Krzysztof Wójcik (politician) (born 1958), Polish politician
Krzysztof Wójcik (volleyball) (born 1960), retired Polish volleyball player